Brigadier Brian Thomas McMahon  (born 1929) is a retired New Zealand Defence Force officer. He worked as a venereologist before joining the Defence Force and served in the Vietnam War from 1969 to 1970. He also served in the United Kingdom, Malaysia and Singapore. From 1980 to 1983, he was director-general of Defence Force Medical Services. After retiring from the Defence Force, McMahon worked as medical superintendent of the Wakari Hospital and then Dunedin Hospital. In retirement he has carried out charity work, particularly in relation to leprosy. He was given the Royal New Zealand Returned and Services' Association ANZAC of the Year Award in 2011.

Early life 
Born in Dunedin in 1929, Brian McMahon was educated at Otago Boys' High School. He went on to the University of Otago, and is a graduate of its Medical School. He worked part-time as a venereologist in several New Zealand hospitals from 1953.

Military service
McMahon began a career in the New Zealand Defence Force in 1966 as resident medical officer at the Waiouru Military Camp. In 1968, he was appointed to run the sexual health services of the Defence Force.  

In 1969, McMahon served with the New Zealand forces in the Vietnam War, as part of the 1st New Zealand Services Medical Team. He left Vietnam in 1970, and later served in the United Kingdom, Singapore and Malaysia, the latter occasion as medical officer to the 1st Battalion, Royal New Zealand Infantry Regiment. McMahon was appointed director-general of Defence Force Medical Services in 1980 and retired in 1983. During the same period, McMahon served as Honorary Surgeon to the Queen.

Later life 
After leaving the military, McMahon served as medical superintendent of Wakari Hospital and then Dunedin Hospital. He was also medical officer of health in Otago and Southland, and a senior lecturer at Otago Medical School.

In the 1983 Queen's Birthday Honours, McMahon was appointed a Commander of the Order of the British Empire. The same year he became an officer of the Most Venerable Order of the Hospital of St John of Jerusalem, being appointed a commander in the same order in 1985 and a knight in 1990. He is also a knight commander of the Order of St Lazarus.

In retirement, McMahon has continued to mentor medical students. He was appointed to the honorary role of colonel commandant of the Royal New Zealand Army Medical Corps in 1992 and held that role until 1995. He was appointed to a second term from 2005 to 2008. McMahon served as life governor of Otago Boys' High School Old Boys' Society from 2000 to 2017 when he voluntarily relinquished the role.

In 1998, McMahon returned to Vietnam to reopen a hospital at Bong Son that had been destroyed during the war. During the trip he visited the site where a friend and sergeant had been killed by a land mine in front of McMahon.

McMahon is a member of the Leprosy Trust Board Fiji and regularly visits the South West Pacific and South East Asia on missions with the Pacific Leprosy Foundation. He has also helped to raise $3 million for the neurosurgery chair at Dunedin Hospital.

In April 2011, McMahon was awarded the second Royal New Zealand Returned and Services' Association ANZAC of the Year Award, which was presented to him by the governor-general, Sir Anand Satyanand, at Government House, Wellington. He was also appointed the first patron of the University of Otago Medical School Brain Health Research Centre. In 2019, a scholarship was established in McMahon's name for second-year Bachelor of Health Science students at Auckland University of Technology. The $10,000 scholarship was funded by Veterans' Affairs New Zealand and the Ranfurly Veterans Trust, and commemorates New Zealand medical personnel of the Vietnam War. McMahon has five children.

References 

1929 births
Living people
People from Dunedin in health professions
People educated at Otago Boys' High School
New Zealand brigadiers
New Zealand medical doctors
Commanders of the Order of the British Empire
Knights of the Order of St John
University of Otago alumni
New Zealand military personnel of the Vietnam War
Venereologists
Recipients of the Order of Saint Lazarus (statuted 1910)
Military personnel from Dunedin